The Moses Kill is an approximately  tributary stream of the Hudson River in New York state. The source is in the foothills of the Taconic Mountains in Hartford in Washington county.  The stream flows thru the town and village of Argyle before entering the Hudson River at Fort Edward, just south of Griffin Island. Beginning in the late 1760s the Moses Kill's water was dammed at a few locations to support several small mills near Argyle Village.

See also
List of rivers of New York

References 

Rivers of New York (state)
Tributaries of the Hudson River
Rivers of Washington County, New York